Wiro J. Niessen is a Dutch scientist in biomedical image analysis and machine learning. He is full professor at both Erasmus MC, University Medical Center Rotterdam and Delft University of Technology. He is founder and scientific lead of Quantib, an AI company in medical imaging. In 2015 he received the Simon Stevin Meester Award from the Netherlands Organization for Scientific Research. From 2016 to 2019 he was president of the Medical Image Computing and Computer Assisted Interventions Society. In 2017 he was elected to  The Netherlands Royal Academy of Arts & Sciences. He is director of the AI platform of the European Organization for Biomedical Imaging Research.

Career
Wiro Niessen was born in Geldrop, on November 15, 1969. He received a master's degree in physics in 1993, and later a PhD in medical imaging from Utrecht University in 1997. Part of his MSc was carried out at the University of Wisconsin, part of his PhD research at Yale University. He was a postdoctoral researcher, assistant professor and associate professor at the Image Science Institute of the University Medical Center Utrecht from 1997 to 2004. 
He was appointed full professor of biomedical image processing in the departments of radiology and medical informatics at the Erasmus University Medical Center in 2005. His research foci include computer vision, biomedical image analysis, and computer assisted interventions. He was also appointed professor at Delft University of Technology at the faculty of Applied Sciences the same year.

In 2017 he was elected a member of the Royal Netherlands Academy of Arts and Sciences.

Selected publications
Poels, Mariëlle MF, et al. "Cerebral microbleeds are associated with worse cognitive function: the Rotterdam Scan Study." Neurology 78.5 (2012): 326–333.
Vernooij, M. W., et al. "Prevalence and risk factors of cerebral microbleeds: the Rotterdam Scan Study." Neurology 70.14 (2008): 1208–1214.
Frangi, Alejandro F., et al. "Automatic construction of multiple-object three-dimensional statistical shape models: Application to cardiac modeling." IEEE transactions on medical imaging 21.9 (2002): 1151–1166.
Frangi, Alejandro F., et al. "Multiscale vessel enhancement filtering." International conference on medical image computing and computer-assisted intervention. Springer, Berlin, Heidelberg, 1998.

References

Academic staff of Erasmus University Rotterdam
Academic staff of the Delft University of Technology
1969 births
Living people
Members of the Royal Netherlands Academy of Arts and Sciences